Robert Harold Jenkins (June 30, 1873 – November 5, 1939) was a merchant, investment dealer and political figure in Prince Edward Island, Canada. He represented Queen's in the House of Commons of Canada from 1925 to 1930 as a Liberal member.

He was born at Mount Albion, Prince Edward Island, the son of Robert Jenkins and Jessie Currie. Jenkins graduated from the Commercial College in Charlottetown in 1889. For a time, he was involved in the trade in eggs with the United States and then entered the grocery trade in Charlottetown. In 1897, he married Minnie M. Hooper. He was the 22nd mayor of Charlottetown from 1923 to 1924. Jenkins was defeated when he ran for reelection to the House of Commons in 1930.

References 
 
 MacKinnon, DA & Warburton, AB Past and Present of Prince Edward Island ... (1906) p. 686

1873 births
1939 deaths
Liberal Party of Canada MPs
Members of the House of Commons of Canada from Prince Edward Island
Mayors of Charlottetown